Agyneta bermudensis is a species of sheet weaver found in Bermuda. It was described by Strand in 1906.

References

bermudensis
Endemic fauna of Bermuda
Spiders of the Caribbean
Spiders described in 1906